Dyfi Estuary Mudflats are mudflats on the estuary of the River Dyfi in Ceredigion, Wales, and are part of the Dyfi National Nature Reserve.

Ecology
The Dyfi Estuary is located on the conjunction of the counties of Ceredigion, Gwynedd and Powys. The area is designated a Special Protection Area (SPA), a protected site for wild birds under the EC Birds Directive. The area comprises the estuary and adjoining salt marsh and includes sandbanks, mudflats, peat bogs, river channels, meanders and creeks, with an extensive sand dune complex across the mouth of the estuary at Ynyslas.

A large part of the western shore is owned and managed by the RSPB. The site is an established wintering area for Greenland white-fronted geese, this area being the most southerly regularly used the UK.

The estuary is also a feeding ground for large numbers of dunlin, oystercatcher, sanderling, Manx shearwater and terns.

References

External links

www.geograph.co.uk : photos of the Dyfi Estuary mudflats and surrounding area

Landforms of Ceredigion
National nature reserves in Wales
Coast of Ceredigion
Ramsar sites in Wales
Wetlands of Wales